Mi Renrong (born September 7, 1977 in Suining, Sichuan) is a female Chinese softball player who competed at the 2004 Summer Olympics.

In the 2004 Olympic softball competition she finished fourth with the Chinese team. She played seven matches as catcher.

External links
Profile at Yahoo! Sports

1977 births
Living people
Olympic softball players of China
People from Suining
Softball players at the 2004 Summer Olympics
Softball players
Sportspeople from Sichuan